Cloroqualone is a quinazolinone-class GABAergic and is an analogue of methaqualone developed in the 1980s and marketed mainly in France and some other European countries. It has sedative and antitussive properties resulting from its agonist activity at the β subtype of the GABAa receptor and sigma-1 receptor, and was sold either alone or in combination with other ingredients as a cough medicine. Cloroqualone has weaker sedative properties than methaqualone and was sold for its useful cough-suppressing effects, but was withdrawn from the French market in 1994 because of concerns about its potential for abuse and overdose.

See also 
 Methaqualone
 Afloqualone
 Etaqualone
 Methylmethaqualone
 Mecloqualone
 Mebroqualone
 Diproqualone
 Gamma-Aminobutyric acid

References 

Sedatives
Chloroarenes
Quinazolinones
GABAA receptor positive allosteric modulators